Winnifred Eaton was the first principal of the Eva Rose York Bible Training and Technical School for Women in Tuni, Andhra Pradesh, India.  Eaton used to participate in the joint conferences of the overseas missionaries comprising the Americans and the Canadians.  She was a member of the Asiatic Society of Bengal.

The Eva Rose York Bible Training and Technical School for Women was first located in Palakonda, and was later moved to its present location in Tuni.  Winnifred first served in Palakonda and was a pioneer in developing methods of education for the care of the women of India.

References

Canadian Indologists
Canadian Baptist Ministries missionaries in India
Canadian Baptist Ministries